Josephine Dene Laffin is an Australian historian and a senior lecturer at Australian Catholic University. She is known for her research on Australian saints and clergymen, particularly Matthew Beovich.

Books
Matthew Beovich :A Biography, Wakefield Press, 2008
The Duffer's Guide to Theology: The Tutorial Notes of Michael Alexander, London: Marshall Pickering, 1997
The Duffer's Guide to the Old Testament, Zondervan, 1996
Duffer's Guide to the Early Church, Zondervan, 1995
True Confessions: The Early Church History Tutorial Notes of Michael Alexander, Adelaide: Openbook, 1993
What Does it Mean to be a Saint?: Reflections on Mary Mackillop (Saints and Holiness in the Catholic Tradition), edited by Josephine Laffin, Wakefield Press, 2010

See also
Catholic peace traditions
Religion in Australia
James Gleeson (bishop)
Andrew Killian
John O'Reily
Mary MacKillop

References

External links
Josephine Laffin at ACU
Josephine Laffin at Flinders University

Australian Christian theologians
Australian historians
Living people
Academic staff of Flinders University
Academic staff of the Australian Catholic University
Year of birth missing (living people)
University of Adelaide alumni
Flinders University alumni